The Maulets was a partisan group of Valencian supporters of Archduke Charles, who claimed the Spanish throne as Charles III during the War of the Spanish Succession.  They were antagonists to the Botiflers camp, the supporters of competing claimant and eventual winner of the war, Philip, Duke of Anjou (Philip V).

Maulets is also the name of a present-day political organisation for youths supporting Catalan independence from Spain.

Historical context
As a compensation for having lost the Moor workforce which was expelled from Spain in 1492, the King gave the nobility all the right on the lands that these people had farmed before leaving. This allowed them to impose on the newly arrived Christian population taxes and partitions of lands which in some counties became a very high expense for the peasants. Probably, the hunger for land amongst those poor families led them to accept the conditions, and during 50 years there were no known protests.

Towards the end of the 17th century, a part of these new peasant population profited from the prosperity arising from cultivating and exporting mainly wine and its derivatives, brandy and prunes, and in lesser extent, silk. Then, they started to question the high payments asked by the nobility, which considerably reduced their profits, and tried by all means, from legal suits to armed revolt, to end this system. But the judiciary path, being fully under the control of the Nobles, proved useless; and the armed revolt, called nowadays Segona Germania (Second Brotherhood), was crushed by the Vice-Chancellor and armies of the Nobles in the year 1693, at the "battle" of Setla de Nunyes.

The peasants in this Segona Germania revolt claimed more or less the same as the Maulets would a few years later. They refused the right of the Lords on the former Moorish lands, and called on the Medieval rights given by James I of Aragon during the conquest of the Kingdom, to denounce an alleged lack of legality of the exploitation by the lords, “who treated them like Moors”, given the case that the Laws of the Kingdom banned these kind of taxes and tributes to the Christians. The Nobles, alleged that the King Philip III, expelling the Moriscos, had given them those lands in property, on which they then had every right to regulate.

After their military defeat, the peasants unrest loomed. New clashes were ready to start in 1700 when Charles II of Spain died with no sons or clear heir, setting the conditions for the War of the Spanish Succession.

When Philip V of Spain took possession of the Kingdom of Valencia (one of the component kingdoms of the larger Spanish Kingdom) as a Felip IV of Valencia, there were already many supporters of the archduke Charles of Austria in this territory, as well as in the Principality of Catalonia and Majorca. Their reasons were various, ranging from loyalty to the dynasty of the House of Austria, hate towards the French by a part of the merchants and the industrials, and distrust for the suspected centralist attitude of Philip V of Spain, as seen by the Bourbon rule in France.

Merchants and exporters of wine, brandy, silk, and other farming products, which was politically and economically very important, contacted a key person for their cause : General Joan Baptista Basset.

General Basset was a Valencian, probably born in Alboraia in an artisan family, who spoke the people’s language and knew very well their claims and needs. He had served during the wars in Italy and Hungary under Prince George of Hesse-Darmstadt, a German Noble who had been before Viceroy in Catalonia.
 
The War of the Spanish Succession had a double nature. On the one side, it was a Spanish internal issue, on the other side, it was a major European war for international hegemony. England and the Netherlands (the so-called "Maritime powers", traditional destinations of the Valencian merchants' exports) sided against the Bourbon pretender, Philip V of Spain. As a part of a blockade, Valencian exports to these countries stopped, which meant a total downfall for merchants and the peasants that sold them their Valencian products. The exports to France, a land that produced and exported the same products, did not compensate them in any way for the losses.

Successful Rebellion 
Since the year 1704, Francesc Davila, who probably was a leader of the Segona Germania who had escaped persecution, toured all the southern counties of Valencia explaining to the peasants that the Austrian pretender was ready to abolish all the rights of the Nobles to higher taxes than the ones imposed by Jaume I. When Joan Baptista Basset disembarked in Altea in August 1705, a new revolt commenced and spread out everywhere.

Basset rode to Valencia, via Dénia, Gandia and Alzira without meeting any real resistance. When the mostly Bourbonic supporting Nobles or the fortresses tried to resist, it were the armed villagers who forced them to flee. Together with the viceroy, Duke Gandia, a long list of Nobles and “botiflers” siding with Philip V of Spain fled, not to Valencia, but to Castile; they did not trust the resistance of the capital, and with reason.

The city of Valencia opened its doors to the Maulet army without resistance. On the contrary, it was received with popular enthusiasm. At the same time, news from the uprising in the Principality of Catalonia arrived, where a rebelling had expelled the “felipist” military and where Charles III himself had triumphantly disembarked in Barcelona. This news was enough to spread the uprising through in the rest of the Kingdom of Valencia, especially in its North part, from Vinaròs and Benicarló to Vila-real and Castelló, where the Maulets where specially strong.

Once Basset was established in Valencia, practically exercising the function of Viceroy, and with most of the country under control of the Maulets (meaning, of the armed villagers), the first thing was to abolish all taxes to the Nobles.

Basset even went further and with the doubtful legality of his high office, stopped paying any kind of tax to the tax collectors of the King. He also abolished the right of doors, a hated tax on products coming from the colonies into Valencia.

He also tolerated, and even stimulated, a real persecution, expulsion and arrest of French citizens, mainly merchants, who were seen by the population as enemies and by the native merchants as dangerous competitors.

Obviously the relationships with the Maritime powers, allied to Charles III were re-established, and the harbours were again opened to Dutch and English ships, resuming trade as before. At the same time, Basset and the Maulets arrested and ousted the most notorious “botiflers”, and seized their possessions.

Clash amongst allies 
Basset, now in control of the Valencian country, had to organize armed resistance against Bourbonic attacks. He realized quickly that his peasant army of Maulets was no match for the professional Bourbonic army, let alone their French allies.

Basset asked Charles III for military help. The help came, in the form of Earl of Peterborough and his English soldiers. Even though his arrival saved the delicate situation from enemies attacks, it also meant the creation of another political power led by count Cardona, with a military force independent from the Maulets and with no intention of allowing what they considered “plebeian excesses”.

It all points to the fact that count Cardona and the English general had instructions, probably from the King, to end the “excesses” of Basset and the Maulets, in this way trying to gain back the support of the Nobles, most of them siding with the Bourbons.

Sure enough, Charles III, as an owner of royal lands and main lord of the Order of Montesa, had experienced a reduction in his income, by the Maulets refusal to pay. This money was absolutely necessary to keep the very expensive army together with which he hoped to win the war. In consequence, it was necessary to stop the Maulets and their chief, general Basset, but it was needed to do it wisely and with indulgence.

Cardona and Peterborough then started an offensive centred at some of Basset's collaborators, pointing to the illegal confiscation and loot for personal use of the goods from the French and the Botiflers, and imprisoned them awaiting trial. Meanwhile, Basset was lured away from Valencia, first to Alzira and later on to Xàtiva, encouraging him to take part in the fighting. They awaited an opportunity to imprison him, but were fearful of his great popularity amongst the people and feared a rebellion of the Maulets if that ever happened.

The occasion came when Charles III had defeated the Bourbons in Castile and had managed to enter Madrid on June 27, 1706. In between the popular celebrations, Peterborough secretly sent troops to Xàtiva, with the order to arrest Basset and imprison him in a fortress in English hands. When news came out, effectively the people revolted.

In Valencia the shouts of “Long live to Basset, before than Charles III” proved the real allegiances of the Valencian Maulets. In fact, Peterborough had to turn those cannons meant to defend Valencia from the Bourbons, around to aim at the revolting population, to drive them off. During days there were demonstrations of protest, letters sent to Charles in Barcelona and all kind of public declarations in favour of Basset and his reforms. But a renewed Maulet revolt, this time against one whom they considered their legitimate King, all with a Bourbon army at the doors of the Kingdom ready for war, would have been suicidal. A victory of the Bourbons would have meant the return of the Botiflers, and the previous state of affairs. Consequently, Maulets resigned and stopped their protests, believing that the pretender Charles, in coming to Valencia shortly, would repair the injustice and would free Basset.

Defeat and Retreat 
Meanwhile, the Maulets continued refusing to pay the door rights, or any other taxes.  Charles III demanded from the authorities from Valencia to call for its payment, without too much success. 
But time was running out. Charles had already been forced to abandon Madrid and suffered a crushing defeat in the hands of the Duke of Berwick in the Battle of Almansa.
Charles withdrew towards Barcelona, and with him the Viceroy, the whole administration and surviving troops.

The people and the Maulets were left at the mercy of the Bourbon advance. King Philip never hid his intentions to overrun the Furs (the Valencian laws) “by the just right of conquest”. The Valencian kingdom disappeared as a legal structure, and was only left as a name, empty of meaning.

The Maulets resisted, especially in Xàtiva, a town which had to be taken by the Bourbonics after a fierce battle, and was afterwards razed and set on fire as a reprisal. In Valencia, the Maulets tried in vain to hinder the entrance of the Bourbonic army, but Berwick and Asfeld managed their way in.

When, in 1710, the war seemed to turn back in favor of Charles III, the city of Valencia raised again in anti-Bourbon revolt. The Maulets appeared on the streets again, awaiting in vain an Austriacista fleet that had to disembark troops at the harbour. A few remaining Valencian Maulets withdrew towards Catalonia still in the hands of Charles III.

Barcelona 1714, the last stand 
Thousands of Valencian refugees concentrated in Barcelona and other cities of the Principality of Catalonia. But the international events made clear the futility of carrying on the struggle. Charles III himself had signed a peace treaty with Philip V of Spain and went back to Austria. The Maritime powers had accepted Philip V as king of Spain and had evacuated their troops from Barcelona over sea. The Catalans and the Valencian Maulets carried on fighting for their cause devoid of international allies.

When the Bourbonic armies, led by Berwick himself, laid siege on Barcelona two regiments of Valencians were formed, the Mare de Déu dels Desamparats and the Sant Vicent Ferrer, to fight along their comrades in Catalonia.

On September 11, 1714, when Barcelona fell in Bourbonic hands after a determined fight, many Maulets were counted among the fallen. Many others, amongst them General Basset, who had directed the artillery of the resistance, were arrested and imprisoned. Others, who managed to escape from the Bourbonic troops via Majorca, or who were later on freed, ended up exiled in Vienna, at the court of “their” Charles III, now emperor of Austria.

Sources 
The War of Spanish Succession in Dénia (Valencia) (Spanish)
Original Spanish version on Foro Libre

Military history of Catalonia
History of the Valencian Community
War of the Spanish Succession